San Basilio may refer to:

Places
 San Basilio (Rome), a neighbourhood in North-East Rome
 San Basilio, Sardinia, a comune in South Sardinia, Italy
 San Basilio, Grontardo, a Roman Catholic parish church in Grontardo, Cremona, Italy
 San Basilio, Córdoba, a neighbourhood in Córdoba, Spain
 San Basilio de Palenque, a village and corregimiento in Mahates, Bolivar, Colombia

See also
 
 Basilio (disambiguation)
 Saint Basil the Great